Hamid Berguiga (born April 25, 1974, in Ouargla) is a former Algerian footballer.

Club career
On December 31, 2010, Berguiga left ES Sétif. During his time with the club, he made 13 league appearances, scoring 2 goals.

Statistics

Honours
 Won the CAF Cup twice with JS Kabylie in 2001 and 2002
 Won the Algerian league twice with JS Kabylie in 2004 and 2006
 Won the Singapore League Cup once with Brunei DPMM FC in 2009
 Won the North African Cup Winners Cup once with ES Sétif in 2010
 Top scorer of the Algerian league twice with JS Kabylie in 2004/2005 (18 goals) and 2005/2006 (18 goals)

References

1974 births
Algerian footballers
Living people
JS Kabylie players
CR Belouizdad players
Expatriate footballers in Singapore
Singapore Premier League players
Expatriate footballers in Brunei
JSM Béjaïa players
USM El Harrach players
ES Sétif players
Algerian Ligue Professionnelle 1 players
Algerian expatriate sportspeople in Singapore
RC Kouba players
Algerian expatriate footballers
Algerian Ligue 2 players
People from Ouargla
DPMM FC players
Association football forwards
21st-century Algerian people